Runcorn Town Football Club is an English association football club based in Runcorn, Cheshire, England. After spending most of their years in the West Cheshire League, they were elected to the North West Counties League in 2010 and are currently in Division One North. Their home ground is Viridor Community Stadium in Runcorn. Runcorn Town also has a Youth Team playing in the North West Youth Alliance and four junior teams under the club's umbrella.

History

Runcorn Sunday League: 1967 to 1974
Runcorn Town were formed in 1967 under the name of CKD and played in the Runcorn Sunday League. They changed their name to Mond FC in 1970, but little is known about the club's early years. At the start of the 1974–75 season, they made the decision to try Saturday football in the Warrington & District Football League.

Warrington and District Football League: 1974 to 1984
At the end of their first season, Mond amalgamated with Premier Division team ICI Weston, becoming Mond Rangers. They remained in the Warrington & District Football League until 1984–85 when they were elected to join the West Cheshire League Division Two, but the link was maintained with the WDL with a reserve team setup. Les Walsh was leading goal scorer with 32 goals including 3 hat tricks

West Cheshire Football League: 1984 to 2010
Mond Rangers established themselves as a solid mid-table team and it was not until the 1991–92 season that they won their first silverware as they won the West Cheshire Bowl as well as finishing a respectable sixth-place finish in Division 2. The following season they finished third in the league and reached the Bowl final, and improved again the following season by finishing third in the league, and regaining the Bowl.

Promotion was achieved in 1994–95 when they finished second in the league. They also reached the Final of the Cheshire Amateur Cup but lost 2–1 to Poulton Victoria in a match played at Prenton Park, Tranmere. Apart from a 5th-placed finish in 1996–97, the club were perennial strugglers in Division One, and were relegated for the first time in their history in 2001–02.

The 2004–05 season saw success return to the club with the first team finishing as runners up in Division Two, winning the Runcorn Senior Cup and reaching the final of the Cheshire Bowl again.

Before the start of the 2005–06 season, the club changed their name to Runcorn Town. A decision was also taken to improve facilities at the club with a view to joining the North West Counties League, but the club suffered a heartbreaking relegation at the end of this season, slipping into the relegation zone for the first time on the last day of the season.

The following season the club won Division Two for the first time in the club's history and were promoted.  The 2007–08 season was probably the most successful in the club's history. The club won the Runcorn Cup, were runners up in the Pyke Cup, and finished third in Division 1, which remains the club's joint highest ever finish. They followed this with a 4th-place finish in 2008–09 and another third-place finish in 2009–10.

In June 2010 the club, having added floodlights to their home ground, applied to join the North West Counties Football League and after approval from the league and The Football Association officially joined after the League's AGM in mid June.

North West Counties Football League: 2010 to present
In their opening match in Division One in August 2010 they beat Abbey Hey 5–1 with Marvin Molyneux scoring Town's first ever goal in the league after just three minutes.

The first season was a real success, with the club losing just two of their 34 league matches. Promotion to the Premier Division was achieved at the first attempt following a 2–0 victory at Pavilions against Chadderton, and they finished the season as runners up in the league. They finished the season on a club record run of 25 league games without defeat.

In their first season in the Premier Division, Runcorn Town continued their success by finishing as runners up behind Ramsbottom United.

The subsequent seasons saw Town struggle to recapture past form in the NWCFL Premier Division, finishing 4th, 5th and 13th twice in successive seasons, although they established themselves somewhat as a Cup team. Continued success in the FA Vase seen them reach at least the second round in every season entered, whilst in 2014–15 they reached the third qualifying round of the FA Cup for the first time, famously winning at Conference North side Barrow.

2016 brought the appointment of Chris Herbert as manager after Simon Burton left the club after a seven-year period. It was an uphill battle to get a squad together, with only one player retained from the previous season. There were no real cup runs this year, but Town bounced back in the league to finish third, level on points with runners-up Bootle.

The 2017–18 season saw the club get off to a record breaking start as they won their first 11 games of the season, with the first defeat coming in November. But the bad weather over winter saw momentum halted, playing just once in 35 days, and in ten league games until February, Town picked up just seven points. The end to the season was almost as good as the start, but they left themselves too much to do and finished third once more, albeit with a club record 93 points.

The 2018–19 season saw Runcorn Town in and among the leading sides until Christmas, but midway through the season, Herbert left the club to take a full time role at National League side Salford City. Midfielder Paul McManus accepted the role on a caretaker basis, and was appointed as permanent player-manager prior to the final game of the season.

The 2019–20 season was declared null and void after the season was cancelled due to the worldwide Covid-19 pandemic. The final game of the season was a 5-0 win at home to Burscough on 14 March 2020. There were good runs in the FA Cup - losing eventually to Farsley Celtic in the 2nd Qualifying Round - and also the League Cup - Town progressed to the semi-final before the competition was cancelled.

The 2020–21 season barely got started before again being curtailed due to the Covid-19 pandemic. In one of the few games played, Town beat AFC Liverpool on penalties following a thrilling 3-3 draw to reach the final of the League Cup.

The League Cup final was played at the beginning of the 2021–22 season, with Town losing 6-3 to 1874 Northwich. In October 2021 a new management team was brought in - Niall McGuinness and Aden Shannon taking over as joint managers, lasting just six months in charge.

A new management team led by Matt Barnes were brought in for the start of the 2022-23 season, tasked with building a new squad to challenge for promotion back to the Premier Division.

Cup competitions

FA Cup
The club entered the FA Cup for the first time in the 2011–12 season, and played their first ever match in the competition in the Extra Preliminary Round on 20 August 2011 at home to Northern Counties East Football League Premier Division side Brighouse Town. Town won 4–1 with Scott Burton becoming the club's first ever goalscorer in the competition.

The club's best performance in the competition came in the 2014-15 season when they reached the third qualifying round before losing 5-2 at home to Northern Premier League Division 1 south side Norton United. In the previous second qualifying round, Runcorn Town had beaten National League North leaders Barrow 1-0 at Holker Street.

FA Vase
The club entered the FA Vase for the first time in the 2010–11 season, and played their first ever match in the competition in the second qualifying round on 18 September 2010 away at Northern Counties East Football League Premier Division side Parkgate, having received a bye in the first qualifying round. James McShane scored Runcorn Town's first ever goal in the competition with Town performing winning 3–1.

The club's best performance in the competition came in the 2012-13 season when they reached the fifth round proper before losing 2–1 (after extra time) at home to Midland Football Alliance league side Walsall Wood.

Cheshire Senior Cup
The 2010–11 season was also Town's debut in the Cheshire Senior Cup. Having got a bye in the first round, they entertained Northern Premier League Division One North side Warrington Town in the second round. Despite a two league gap between the sides, Town drew 1–1 after extra time, before losing 4–2 on penalties.

One notable game in the competition came in the 2011–12 season which saw Runcorn Town drawn away at Northern Premier League side Woodley Sports in the first round. The game was notable as it was the first competitive game that the club had played on a synthetic playing surface. Three goals in the second half of extra time saw Town lose 4–1 after a 1–1 draw in 90 minutes.

Liverpool Senior Cup
The club entered the Liverpool Senior Cup for the first time in the 2019-20 season. Having received a bye in the first round, Litherland REMYCA F.C. were defeated 4-1 in the second round. The quarter-final saw a young Tranmere Rovers F.C. run out 2-0 winners at the Viridor Community Stadium.

Honours

League
 North West Counties Football League, Premier Division – Runners-Up: 2011–12
 North West Counties Football League, Division 1 – Runners-Up: 2010–11
 North West Counties Football League, Macron Cup – Runners-Up: 2019–20
 West Cheshire League, Division 2 – Champions: 2006–07. Runners-Up: 2004–05, 1994–95

Cup
 Cheshire Amateur Cup – Runners-Up: 1994–95
 Pyke Cup – Runners-Up: 2007–08
 West Cheshire Bowl – Winners: 1991–92, 1993–94. Runners-Up: 1992–93, 2004–05
 Bill Weight Memorial Trophy – Winners: 1995–96, 2005–06, 2007–08
 Runcorn Senior Cup – Winners: 2004–05, 2005–06, 2007–08. Runners-Up: 2009–10

Players

Current squad

Notable former players 

James McShane scored 163 goals in 288 appearances between 2007 and 2016.

Craig Cairns scored 133 goals in 142 appearances between 2016 and 2022.

Nick Haughton made 14 appearances during the 2013/14 season before joining Fleetwood Town. He played in the Football League with Fleetwood and also won the FA Trophy at Wembley with AFC Fylde in 2019.

Tom Crawford made 6 appearances on loan from Chester during the 2017/18 season. He joined League 2 side Notts County in 2018.

Mark McGregor made 36 appearances between 2016 and 2018 and was also Assistant Manager. He has a wealth of experience in the Football League with Wrexham, Burnley, Blackpool and Port Vale.

Louis Moss made 3 appearances in 2017. He also has 8 caps for Barbados.

Management

League history

Records
All of the below records are under the Runcorn Town name from the 2005–06 season, as no comprehensive records exist for the club under the Mond Rangers name.

Club records

Wins and losses

Best performance

Sequences

Attendances

Player records

Appearances

Goals

References

External links

 Official website

Football clubs in England
Football clubs in Cheshire
North West Counties Football League clubs
Association football clubs established in 1967
Runcorn
1967 establishments in England
West Cheshire Association Football League clubs